The Prophecy of the Popes ("Prophecy of Saint-Archbishop Malachy, concerning the Supreme Pontiffs") is a series of 112 short, cryptic phrases in Latin which purport to predict the Catholic popes (along with a few antipopes), beginning with Celestine II. It was first published in 1595 by Benedictine monk Arnold Wion, who attributed the prophecy to Saint Malachy, a 12th-century archbishop of Armagh.

Given the accurate description of popes up to around 1590 and lack of accuracy for the popes that follow, historians generally conclude that the alleged prophecy is a pseudepigraphic fabrication written shortly before publication. The Catholic Church has no official stance, though some Catholic theologians have dismissed it as forgery.

The prophecy concludes with a pope identified as "Peter the Roman", whose pontificate will allegedly precede the destruction of the city of Rome.

History

Publication and content

The alleged prophecy was first published in 1595 by a Benedictine named Arnold Wion in his Lignum Vitæ, a history of the Benedictine order. He attributed it to Saint Malachy, the 12th‑century Archbishop of Armagh. He explained that the prophecy had not, to his knowledge, ever been printed before, but that many were eager to see it. Wion includes both the alleged original prophecy, consisting of short, cryptic Latin phrases, as well as an interpretation applying the statements to historical popes up to Urban VII (pope for thirteen days in 1590), which Wion attributes to historian Alphonsus Ciacconius.

Origin theories
According to an account put forward in 1871 by Abbé Cucherat, Malachy was summoned to Rome in 1139 by Pope Innocent II to receive two wool palliums for the metropolitan sees of Armagh and Cashel. While in Rome, Malachy purportedly experienced a vision of future popes, which he recorded as a sequence of cryptic phrases. This manuscript was then allegedly deposited in the Vatican Secret Archives, and forgotten about until its rediscovery in 1590, supposedly just in time for a papal conclave occurring at the time.

Several historians have concluded that the prophecy is a late 16th‑century forgery. Saint Bernard of Clairvaux, a contemporary biographer of Malachy who recorded the saint's alleged miracles, makes no mention of the prophecy. The earliest known reference to them dates to 1587. Spanish monk and scholar Benito Jerónimo Feijóo y Montenegro wrote in his Teatro Crítico Universal (1724–1739), in an entry called Purported prophecies, that the high level of accuracy of the verses up until the date they were published, compared with their high level of inaccuracy after that date, is evidence that they were created around the time of publication. The verses and explanations given by Wion correspond very closely to a 1557 history of the popes by Onofrio Panvinio (including replication of errors made by Panvinio), which may indicate that the prophecy was written based on that source. In 1694, Claude-François Menestrier argued the additional interpretive statements were not written by Ciacconius, as the prophecy was not mentioned in any of Ciacconius' works, nor were the interpretive statements listed among his works.

One theory to explain the prophecy's creation, put forward by 17th-century French priest and encyclopaedist Louis Moréri, among others, is that it was spread by supporters of Cardinal Girolamo Simoncelli in support of his bid to become pope during the 1590 conclave to replace Urban VII. In the prophecy, the pope following Urban VII is given the description "Ex antiquitate Urbis" ("from the old city"), and Simoncelli was from Orvieto, which in Latin is Urbevetanum, old city. Moréri and others proposed the prophecy was created in an unsuccessful attempt to demonstrate that Simoncelli was destined to be pope. However, the discovery of a reference to the prophecy in a 1587 letter has cast doubt on this theory. In this document the entourage of the Cardinal Giovanni Girolamo Albani interprets the motto "De rore coeli" ("From the dew of the sky") as a reference to their master, on the base of the link between "alba" ("dawn") and Albani, and the dew, as a typical morning atmospheric phenomenon.

Interpretation

The interpretation of the entries for pre-publication popes provided by Wion involves close correspondences between the mottos and the popes' birthplaces, family names, personal arms, and pre-papal titles. For example, the first motto, Ex castro Tiberis (from a castle on the Tiber), fits Celestine II's birthplace in Città di Castello, on the Tiber.

Efforts to connect the prophecy to historical popes who were elected after its publication have been more strained. For example, Clement XIII is referred to as Rosa Umbriae (the rose of Umbria), but was not from Umbria nor had he any but the most marginal connection with the region, having been briefly pontifical governor of Rieti, at the time part of Umbria.

One writer notes that among the post-publication (post-1595) popes there remain "some surprisingly appropriate phrases", while adding that "it is of course easy to exaggerate the list's accuracy by simply citing its successes", and that "other tags do not fit so neatly". Among the reported "successes" are "Light in the sky" for Leo XIII (1878–1903), with a comet in his coat of arms; "Religion depopulated" for Benedict XV (1914–22) whose papacy included World War I and the atheistic communist Russian Revolution; and "Flower of flowers" for Paul VI (1963–78), with fleur-de-lys in his coat of arms.

Peter Bander, then Head of Religious Education at Wall Hall teacher training college, wrote in 1969:

M. J. O'Brien, a Catholic priest who authored an 1880 monograph on the prophecy, provided a more scathing assessment:

Petrus Romanus
In recent times, some interpreters of prophetic literature have drawn attention to the prophecy due to its imminent conclusion; if the list of descriptions is matched on a one-to-one basis to the list of historic popes since publication, Benedict XVI (2005–13) would correspond to the second to last of the papal descriptions, Gloria olivae (the glory of the olive).
The longest and final verse predicts the Apocalypse:

This may be translated into English as:

Several historians and interpreters note the prophecy leaves open the possibility of unlisted popes between "the glory of the olive" and the final pope, "Peter the Roman". In the Lignum Vitae, the line In persecutione extrema S.R.E. sedebit. forms a separate sentence and paragraph of its own. While often read as part of the "Peter the Roman" entry, other interpreters view it as a separate, incomplete sentence explicitly referring to one or more popes between "the glory of the olive" and "Peter the Roman".

Popes and corresponding mottos

The list can be divided into two groups; one of the popes and antipopes who reigned prior to the appearance of the prophecy c. 1590, for whom the connection between the motto and the pope is consistently clear. The other is of mottos attributed to popes who have reigned since its appearance, for whom the connection between the motto and the pope is often strained or totally absent and could be viewed as shoehorning or postdiction.

The list has most commonly been divided between mottos 74 and 75, based on the mottos that were explained by Wion and those that were not. Lorenzo Comensoli Antonini divides the list between mottos 73 and 74, based on the loose connection between Urban VII and the motto "From the dew of the sky", and the reference to the prophecy in a 1587 letter, prior to Urban VII's papacy.

René Thibaut divides the table at a different point, between the 71st and 72nd motto, asserting that there is a change in style at this point. He uses this distinction to put forward the view that the first 71 mottos are post-dated forgeries, while the remainder are genuine. Hildebrand Troll echoes this view, noting that mottos 72–112 use a symbolic language related to the character of the pope and his papacy, in contrast to the more literal mottos for earlier popes.

Popes and antipopes 1143–1590 (pre-publication) 
The text on the silver lines below reproduces the original text (including punctuation and orthography) of the 1595 Lignum Vitae, which consisted of three parallel columns for the popes before 1590. The first column contained the motto, the second the name of the pope or antipope to whom it was attached (with occasional errors), and the third an explanation of the motto. There are some indications that both the mottos and explanations were the work of a single 16th-century person. The original list was unnumbered.

Popes 1590 to present (post-publication) 
For this group of popes, the published text only provides names for the first three (i.e., those who were popes between the appearance of the text c. 1590, and its publication in 1595) and provides no explanations.

In fiction
The Prophecy of the Popes is referred to in several works of fiction, including several works of apocalyptic fiction. 
George R. Araujo-Matiz's novel The Roman: Peter II... The Last Pope? features the fictional Pope Peter II as successor to the then Pope Benedict XVI (who dies in the novel). The book begins with the Malachite prophecy concerning Peter the Roman, the last Pope in the Malachite list.
Steve Berry's novel, The Third Secret (2005), features the fictional Pope Peter II (originally Cardinal Valendrea), who is elected Pope after the death of the fictional Pope Clement XV.
Glenn Cooper's novel, The Devil Will Come, uses the Malachy Prophecy as a part of a storyline which spans generations, leading to the "modern day" conclave to elect a new pope and the attempt to destroy the Catholic faith by an enemy of the church.
Peter De Rosa's Pope Patrick (1997) is a novel about the then Pope John Paul II's supposed successor, the fictional Pope Patrick I. The novel assumes that Petrus Romanus, the last Pope in St Malachy's list, is to be regarded as a supernatural being, and that consequently Pope Patrick will be the last real Pope.
Susan Claire Potts' book, Glory of the Olive: A Novel of the Time of Tribulation (2002), features the fictional Pope Peter II. "Glory of the Olive" is the Malachite attribute of the successor to the then Pope John Paul II.
In James Rollins' sixth Sigma Force novel, The Doomsday Key (2009), Saint Malachy's "Doomsday Prophecy", and the conflicts between the Christians and pagans are important plot points, particularly in Chapter 21.

See also
 Bartholomew Holzhauser
 Legends surrounding the papacy
 List of popes
 Nostradamus
 The Prophesying Nun of Dresden
 Three Secrets of Fátima
 Vaticinia de Summis Pontificibus
 Vaticinia Nostradami

Notes

References

Citations

Sources

External links

Original 1595 text of the Prophecies (Arnold Wion, Lignum Vitae, Lib. ii, pp. 307–311)

1595 books
16th-century Latin books
Christian apocalyptic writings
History of the papacy
Forgery controversies
Religious hoaxes
Prophecy in Christianity
Visions (spirituality)